Haukur Eiríksson (born 10 March 1964) is an Icelandic cross-country skier. He competed in the men's 10 kilometre classical event at the 1992 Winter Olympics.

References

1964 births
Living people
Icelandic male cross-country skiers
Olympic cross-country skiers of Iceland
Cross-country skiers at the 1992 Winter Olympics
Place of birth missing (living people)
20th-century Icelandic people